Bobo-Usmon Shamsutdin ugli Baturov (born 16 November 1994 in Jizzakh) is an Uzbekistani amateur boxer.

Amateur carrier 
Gold medalist of Islamic Solidarity Games 2017 welterweight (69 kg)
Winner of 2018 Asian Games in Jakarta in Welterweight (69 kg) weight division.
At the 2019 World Boxing Championships 
He won a bronze medal at the 2019 AIBA World Boxing Championships.

Participiant of olympic games in Tokyo2020

References

External links

1994 births
Living people
Uzbekistani male boxers
People from Jizzakh
Welterweight boxers
AIBA World Boxing Championships medalists
Boxers at the 2018 Asian Games
Asian Games gold medalists for Uzbekistan
Asian Games medalists in boxing
Medalists at the 2018 Asian Games
Boxers at the 2020 Summer Olympics
Olympic boxers of Uzbekistan
21st-century Uzbekistani people